682 Hagar (prov. designation:  or ) is an Eunomia asteroid from the central regions of the asteroid belt. It was discovered on 17 June 1909, by German astronomer August Kopff at the Heidelberg-Königstuhl State Observatory. Possibly inspired by the asteroid's provisional designation "1909 HA", it was named for the biblical woman Hagar.

Orbit and classification 

When applying the hierarchical clustering method to its proper orbital elements, Hagar is a core member of the Eunomia family, a prominent family of stony S-type asteroids and the largest one in the intermediate main belt with more than 5,000 known members. It orbits the Sun in the central main-belt at a distance of 2.2–3.1 AU once every 4 years and 4 months (1,579 days; semi-major axis of 2.65 AU). Its orbit has an eccentricity of 0.17 and an inclination of 12° with respect to the ecliptic. The body's observation arc begins at Vienna Observatory on 28 June 1909, just eleven nights after prior to its official discovery observation by August Kopff at Heidelberg.

Naming 

This minor planet was named after the biblical woman Hagar from the Book of Genesis. She was an Ancient Egyptian servant of Sarah and the mother of Abraham's firstborn, Ishmael. The asteroid's name may have been inspired by the two letters of its provisional designation, "1909 HA". It is also speculated that the name comes from a list created in 1913 by the Astronomisches Rechen-Institut (ARI) containing suggestions of female names from history and mythology for the naming of minor planets (AN 196, 137). At the time, the naming process was not well developed and the ARI feared inconsistencies and potential confusion. The list was sent to several German astronomers, including Kopff, with the invitation to name all of their made discoveries up to number 700.

Physical characteristics 

Based on the overall spectral type of the Eunomia family, Hagar is possibly a common, stony S-type asteroid.

Rotation period 

In August 2013, a rotational lightcurve of Hagar was obtained from nine nights of photometric observations by Frederick Pilcher at the Organ Mesa Observatory  in Arizona. Analysis gave a well-defined, classically shaped bimodal lightcurve with a rotation period of  hours and a high brightness variation of  magnitude. At the same time, Alexander Kurtenkov at Sofia University, and a team of Bulgarian students obtained a concurring period of  hours with an amplitude of  magnitude. In July 2017, French and Swiss astronomers René Roy and Raoul Behrend confirmed the period measuring a nearly identical rotation of  hours and an amplitude of  magnitude.

Poles 

Each modeled lightcurve also determined two spin axes of (93.0°, −71.0°) and (277.0°, −35.0°), as well as (56.0°, −78.0°) and (255.0°, −57.0°) in ecliptic coordinates (λ, β), respectively.

Diameter and albedo 

The Collaborative Asteroid Lightcurve Link adopts Pilcher's albedo of 0.057 and derives a diameter of 19.57 kilometers.

Notes

References

External links 
 Lightcurve Database Query (LCDB), at www.minorplanet.info
 Dictionary of Minor Planet Names, Google books
 Asteroids and comets rotation curves, CdR – Geneva Observatory, Raoul Behrend
 Discovery Circumstances: Numbered Minor Planets (1)-(5000) – Minor Planet Center
 
 

000682
Discoveries by August Kopff
Named minor planets
19090617
Hagar